Barharwa Junction is a railway station on the Sahibganj loop and is located at Barharwa in Sahibganj District in the Indian state of Jharkhand.

History
The Howrah–Delhi main line was initially laid via Sahibganj and opened to traffic in 1866. Later, in 1871 the Raniganj–Kiul line was laid. The Khana–Sahibganj–Kiul section was renamed Sahibganj loop.

In 1913, the Barharwa–Azimganj–Katwa Railway constructed the Barharwa–Azimganj–Katwa loop.

The -long Barharwa–New Farakka link was established later, allowing trains from both Howrah and Delhi to travel to New Jalpaiguri.

Overview

Barharwa Junction is a B-category station under Malda division. It is one of the busiest station in terms of freight and goods trains service. Stone chips and mining materials are supplied all over the country from the hills near Barharwa. It is a junction point as train from Bhagalpur side going towards Malda Town and North Eastern States of India, going towards Azimganj and towards Rampurhat, Bolpur, Burdwan and Howrah and also Santhia-Andal.

References

External links

Gallery

Railway stations in Sahibganj district
Railway junction stations in Jharkhand
Malda railway division
Railway stations opened in 1866
1866 establishments in India